SATENA flies to the following destinations (at November 2022):

References

Lists of airline destinations